Zouhair or Zouheir is a name of Arabic origin.

List of people with the given name 

 Zouhair Abdallah (born 1983), Lebanese footballer
 Zouhair Aouad (born 1989), Bahraini long-distance runner
 Zouhair Bahloul (born 1950), Israeli Arab sports broadcaster, journalist and politician
 Zouhair Bouadoud (born 1986), French-Moroccan footballer
 Zouheir Chokr (born 1947), Lebanese academic and diplomat
 Zouhair El Moutaraji (born 1996), Moroccan professional footballer
 Zouhair El-Ouardi (born 1977), Moroccan middle-distance runner
 Zouhair Feddal (born 1989), Moroccan politician
 Zouhair Khazim (born 1960), Syrian politician
 Zouhair Laaroubi (born 1984), Moroccan footballer
 Zouhair Maghzaoui (born 1965), Tunisian politician
 Zouhair Talbi (born 1995), Moroccan runner
 Zouhair Yahyaoui (1967–2005), Tunisian dissident

List of people with the surname 

 Assia Zouhair (born 1991), Moroccan footballer

See also 

 Zouair

Masculine given names
Arabic masculine given names
Surnames of Arabic origin